Coordinates: 50°14′31″N 64°00′10″V﻿ / 50.24204°N 64.00286°V﻿ / 50.24204; -64.00286

Île à Bouleaux de Terre (English:Inner Birch Island) is an island in Canada.   It is located in the province of Québec, in the east, 1,000 km northeast of the capital city, Ottawa. The area is 1.9 square kilometers. The island lies in the Mingan Archipelago National Park.

The terrain on Île à Bouleaux is flat. The island's highest point is 46 meters above sea-level. It extends 1.6 kilometers from north to south, and 2.0 kilometers from east to west.

The region has a continental climate. The Annual average temperature in the region is 0 °C. The warmest month is August, with an average temperature of 12 °C, and the coldest is February, with −14 °C.

References 

Coastal islands of Quebec